The Paramount Theatre is a 3,040-seat Art Deco concert hall located at 2025 Broadway in Downtown Oakland. When it was built in 1931, it was the largest multi-purpose theater on the West Coast, seating 3,476.   Today, the Paramount is the home of the Oakland East Bay Symphony and the Oakland Ballet. It regularly plays host to R&B, jazz, blues, pop, rock, gospel, classical music, as well as ballets, plays, stand-up comedy, lecture series, special events, and screenings of classic movies from Hollywood's Golden Era.

History
The Paramount Theatre was built as a movie palace, during the rise of the motion picture industry in the late 1920s. Palace was both a common and an accurate term for the movie theaters of the 1920s and early 1930s. In 1925, Adolph Zukor's Paramount Publix Corporation, the theater division of Paramount Pictures, one of the great studio-theater chains, began a construction program resulting in some of the finest theaters built. Publix assigned the design of the Oakland Paramount to 38-year-old San Francisco architect Timothy L. Pflueger (1892–1946) of Miller and Pflueger. The Paramount opened at a cost of $3 million on December 16, 1931. Pflueger was also the designer of the Castro Theatre in San Francisco. The Art Deco design referred to the 1925 Exposition Internationale des Arts Décoratifs et Industriels Modernes in Paris. The term Art Deco has been used only since the late 1960s, when there was a revival of interest in the art and fashion of the early 20th century.

The Paramount organ was built by Wurlitzer for the Paramount Publix theaters: a four-manual, twenty-rank model called the Publix I (Opus 2164), which cost $20,000 in 1931.

The gala premiere on December 16, 1931, was attended by Kay Francis, star of the opening film, The False Madonna, and cast members Conway Tearle, Charles D. Brown, Marjorie Gateson, and William Boyd (not yet known as Hopalong Cassidy). Notable guests included California's governor James Rolph and Oakland mayor Fred N. Morcom. Tickets were first-come, first-served: sixty cents for the balcony seat and eighty-five cents for a seat in the orchestra. The program also included a Fox Movietone News newsreel, a Silly Symphony animated cartoon The Spider and the Fly, and the music of the Paramount's own 16-piece house orchestra, under the direction of Lew Kosloff. Last on the program was the stage show Fanchon & Marco's "Slavique Idea", a forty-minute revue featuring Sam Hearn, comedians Brock and Thompson, dancer LaVonne Sweet, the acrobatic Seven Arconis, Patsy Marr, and the Sunkist Beauties in a chorus-line finale.

In June 1932 the Paramount closed, unable to meet operating expenses of more than $27,000 per week. Competing with Paramount was the Fox Oakland Theater, which had opened in 1928. The Paramount stayed closed for nearly a year. The days when movie theaters could support not just the showing of movies, but entire orchestras, stage shows, and uniformed attendants, were over, just as the Paramount was being completed. When it reopened in May 1933, it was under the management of Frank Burhans, the manager of the Warfield Theatre in San Francisco. He was commissioned to get the Paramount out of debt, and his method for achieving this was to operate without either a stage show or an orchestra, and to unscrew light bulbs in an effort to reduce energy expenses. The Paramount showed the best of the new motion pictures, including such features as Dancing Lady (1933) with Joan Crawford and Clark Gable, Dames (1934) with Dick Powell, and The Gay Divorcee (1934) with Fred Astaire and Ginger Rogers. The Great Depression gave way to World War II, and the Port of Oakland became a major departure and arrival point for servicemen. The Paramount's comfortable chairs and spacious lounges were a favorite gathering place. In the 1950s, popcorn machines and candy counters were installed, and on the lobby walls the incandescent lights were taken out and replaced by neon tubing in red and blue. In 1953, it played the first CinemaScope movie The Robe with Richard Burton and Jean Simmons. The 1957 Elvis Presley's Jailhouse Rock attracted a thousand young people. At the end of the 1950s theaters were losing patrons to television, but the Paramount management responded with talent shows, prize nights, and advertising campaigns.

For a second time the Paramount closed on September 15, 1970, because it no longer was able to compete with smaller movie theaters in the suburbs. The Paramount's last film was Let It Be (1970) with The Beatles. In 1971, a Warner Bros. movie, The Candidate, starring Robert Redford, was filmed using the interior of the Paramount as one of the principal locations.

Hope surfaced in October 1972 when the Oakland Symphony Orchestra Association (OSO), in need of a new home, purchased the Paramount for $1 million, half of which was donated by the seller, National General Theaters—formerly the Fox Theaters-West Coast—with the other half coming from generous private donors. The popcorn machines and candy counters were removed. With the help of restoration project manager Peter Botto, new, wider seats were installed, the distance between rows was increased to provide more leg room, and a replica of the original carpet was laid throughout the theater. Two bars, one on the mezzanine and one on the lower level, and a new box office were added. Skidmore, Owings & Merrill were consultants for the restoration, with Milton Pflueger & Associates assisting. The Paramount reopened on September 22, 1973, in its original 1931 splendor. Following the Opening the Oakland Symphony had sold out nearly all seats on subscription sales and sold out a majority of individual concerts.

But even with the house full the Paramount Theatre proved a financial burden to the Oakland Symphony. In addition the Oakland Symphony financed renovation costs with a $1 million loan. Rather than continue absorbing the Paramount's operating losses, the Oakland Symphony transferred the Paramount to the City of Oakland in 1975 for $1 in exchange for 40 years of free rent. They continued with that agreement until the Oakland Symphony Orchestra filed for Chapter 7 bankruptcy in September 1986.

Seeing an opportunity, a group of seven private citizens banded together and approached city officials with the idea of managing and operating the Paramount on behalf of the city as a nonprofit organization. They agreed, and the management structure has remained to this day.

Walking into the main lobby, with its gold ornamentation along the walls, curving staircase, and glowing light fixtures, is like taking a trip back through Old Hollywood. Public tours of the Paramount Theatre are given on the first and third Saturdays of each month, excluding holidays and holiday weekends. Documented in 1972 by the Historic American Buildings Survey, the theater was entered into the National Register of Historic Places on August 14, 1973, and became a California Registered Historical Landmark in 1976 and a U.S. National Historical Landmark in 1977.

Photo gallery

 Alvin Tenpo's smugmug photos of the Paramount Theater, Oakland, California
 Flickr photos of the Paramount Theatre, Oakland, California

Main events

Symphony and ballet
Michael Morgan was music director from September 1990 until his death in August 2021. With its May 18, 2007, performance of George Gershwin's Porgy and Bess sold out, the Oakland East Bay Symphony opened its final rehearsal to the public.

In December 2007, the Oakland Ballet celebrated the 35th anniversary of Ronn Guidi's Nutcracker at the Paramount Theatre, with Michael Morgan conducting the music of Tchaikovsky.

Notable concerts
The Paramount has hosted concerts by a wide variety of acts since the mid-1970s, including Bob Marley & The Wailers, Bruce Springsteen & The E Street Band, Prince, James Brown, Diana Ross, Bonnie Raitt, Al Green, Jeff Beck, Lionel Richie, B.B. King, Anita Baker, Brian Wilson, Elvis Costello, Gladys Knight, Lucinda Williams, and Nelly Furtado.

1974

 Boz Scaggs "Slow Dancer", March 4

1975

 Bob Marley & The Wailers, July 8
 Patti LaBelle with Nona Hendryx and Sarah Dash, September 9
 Nancy Wilson, Les McCann, Hubert Laws, Esther Phillips, Stanley Turrentine, "Jelly Roll Jazz Festival", October 3
 Boz Scaggs "A Night to Remember", December 29

1976

 Grover Washington Jr., George Benson, January 16
 Vladimir Horowitz, February 15
 Bob Marley and the Wailers, May 29 and 30
 Bruce Springsteen & the E Street Band, October 2

1977

 Peter Allen, December 15
 Al Jarreau with The Crusaders, December 31

1978

 Ronnie Laws, Flora Purim, Airto Moreira, February 9
 Oingo Boingo Band, October 31

1986

 Ashford & Simpson, December 6

1988

 Jackson Browne Band, David Crosby, Graham Nash, November 2 and 3

1991

 Natalie Cole (Unforgettable Tour)
 Daryl Hall & John Oates
 Jean-Luc Ponty

1992

 Morris Day, Jerome Benton, Edwin Hawkins, David Whitfield
 En Vogue
 David Sanborn Band with comedian Jeff Cesario

1994

 The Canton Spirituals with The Blind Boys of Alabama, The Fairfield Four
 Lyle Lovett
 Earth, Wind & Fire
 Illinois Jacquet Big Band, J. J. Johnson Quintet, The "Jazz at the Philharmonic" All-Star Jam with Tommy Flanagan, Benny Carter, Roy Haynes and Al McKibbon

1995

 Anita Baker
 Harry Belafonte
 Jackson Browne
 "California Blues – Swingtime Tribute" with Johnny Otis, Charles Brown, Jay McShann, Jimmy Witherspoon, Jimmy McCracklin, Lowell Fulson and Earl Brown
 Fourplay
 Kirk Franklin and Family
 Mississippi Mass Choir with Dorothy Norwood, Olivet Institutional Baptist Church, Choir of Oakland
 Rachelle Ferrell with Will Downing, Gerald Albright, Jonathan Butler
 Bonnie Raitt
 Stevie Wonder
 
1996

 Tori Amos
 k.d. lang
 Tom Waits
 
1997

 Ashford & Simpson with Maya Angelou
 Charles Brown with Ruth Brown, John Lee Hooker, Bonnie Raitt
 Sarah McLachlan with Madeleine Peyroux
 Maxwell
 Nicholas Brothers, Count Basie Orchestra, Donald O'Connor, Williams Brothers
 "Porgy and Bess" concert Joe Henderson sextet with Tommy Flanagan, Dave Holland, Al Foster, Conrad Herwig and Stephan Harris

1998

 Amy Grant
 Lyle Lovett
 Bonnie Raitt
 Lionel Richie

1999

 Jeff Beck
 James Brown
 Sheryl Crow
 Rubén González with Ibrahim Ferrer
 Lauryn Hill
 B.B. King
 Maxwell
 Britney Spears, July 29
 Tom Waits
 Neil Young March 20

2000

 Mary J. Blige
 James Brown with Tower of Power
 D'Angelo
 Will Downing, Gerald Albright, Chanté Moore and Phil Perry
 Rickie Lee Jones, with Dan Hicks & the Hot Licks
 Maze with Frankie Beverly
 Paul Simon

2001

 Erykah Badu
 Björk
 James Brown with Tower of Power
 Isaac Hayes and the Oakland East Bay Symphony: Musical tribute to Gordon Parks
 Alicia Keys
 Maxwell (musician)
 Tori Amos

2002

 Jeff Beck
 Mary J. Blige
 Ani DiFranco, Bruce "U. Utah" Phillips, Toshi Reagon
 Enrique Iglesias
 Alicia Keys with Glenn Lewis
 Pat Metheny Group
 Teddy Pendergrass
 Prince "One Nite Alone With Prince", U.S. Spring tour
 Bonnie Raitt

2003

 Erykah Badu
 Anita Baker
 James Brown
 Earth, Wind & Fire
 Al Green
 Brian McKnight with Mýa
 Sigur Rós

2004

 Natalie Cole
 Will Downing, with Kem, Kenny Lattimore
 Josh Groban
 Enrique Iglesias
 Taj Mahal
 Sarah McLachlan
 The Temptations and the Four Tops
 Wilco Band

2005

 Elvis Costello
 Dead Can Dance
 Bob Dylan
 Tom Jones, with Tower of Power
 Journey
 Alicia Keys
 David Gray
 Gerald Levert, Eddie Levert
 Ricky Martin
 Brian McKnight
 Bonnie Raitt
 Jill Scott
 The Whispers & Howard Hewett

2006

 James Blunt
 Toni Braxton
 Elvis Costello
 Donald Fagen
 David Gilmour
 Al Green with Booker T. Jones
 R. Kelly
 B.B. King, special guest Mavis Staples
 Gladys Knight
 Madeleine Peyroux with Vienna Teng
 Robert Plant
 Tool

2007

 Pepe Aguilar & His 20-Piece Mariachi Orchestra
 Tori Amos
 Benise
 The Black Crowes
 Crowded House
 Earth, Wind & Fire
 Kenny "Babyface" Edmonds
 Nelly Furtado
 Ben Harper & The Innocent Criminals
 Iron & Wine
 Dave Koz with Jonathan Butler, Wayman Tisdale and Kimberley Locke
 Lauryn Hill
 Diana Ross—U.S. "I Love You" tour, Produced by Live Nation, November 4
 Twelve Girls Band
 Tyrese, with Ginuwine
 Lucinda Williams
 Brian Wilson

2008

 Erykah Badu with The Roots
 Bowfire
 Jill Scott
 70s Soul Jam with The Stylistics, Bloodstone, The Delfonics, The Chi-Lites and Main Ingredient featuring Cuba Gooding Sr.
 Donna Summer
 Keith Sweat, Bell Biv DeVoe, Tony! Toni! Toné!
 The Temptations & Four Tops
 The Whispers, Stephanie Mills
 Dream Theater
 Max Raabe and the Palast Orchester

2011

 One Direction

Stand-up comedy
 1974 – George Carlin
 1975 – Richard Pryor, Lily Tomlin
 1997 – Bernie Mac
 2000, 2001 – Jamie Foxx
 2004, 2007 – George Lopez
 2005 – Bill Cosby
 2006 – Lewis Black
 2007 – Mike Epps
 2008 – Cedric the Entertainer, Katt Williams
 Chris Rock (1997, 1999, 2003, 2008)
 The three sold-out performances by Chris Rock in 2003 included a total attendance of 8,883 and a total gross of $448,000.
 Jerry Seinfeld (1996, 2001, 2004, 2011)
 In 2004, the four sold-out performances of Seinfeld grossed $819,390; 12,001 patrons is a record since the renovation and re-opening of the Paramount Theatre back in 1973.
 2023 - Louis CK

Black Comedy Explosion
 1990 Paul Mooney, Martin Lawrence, Shawn Wayans, Damon Wayans, Larry La La, Laura Hayes
 1991 Martin Lawrence, Jamie Foxx, Chris Thomas, Yvette Wilson
 1992 Jamie Foxx, Chris Thomas, Yvette Wilson
 1993 D. L. Hughley, Paul Mooney, Chris Tucker, Yvette Wilson, Ruben Paul
 1994 George Wallace, Mark Curry, Chris Tucker, Chris Spencer
 1995 Chris Rock, Mark Curry, Cedric the Entertainer
 1996 Dave Chappelle, Cedric the Entertainer, Tommy Davidson
 1997 Jamie Foxx, Yvette Wilson, Cedric the Entertainer, Chris Thomas, D. L. Hughley, Arnez J, Sheryl Underwood, Guy Torry
 1998 Tommy Davidson, Don 'D.C.' Curry
 1999 Don "DC" Party, Sheryl Underwood, Mike Epps
 2000 D. L. Hughley
 2001 Guy Torry, Bruce Bruce, Ricky Smiley
 2002 Tommy Davidson, Sheryl Underwood, Alex Thomas
 2004 Sheryl Underwood, Paul Mooney
 2005 D. L. Hughley, Lavelle Crawford
 2007 Lavelle Crawford, Earthquake, Sheryl Underwood, Ruben Paul

Live stage plays
 1997 – The musical play The Wiz was at the Paramount, with Grace Jones, Peabo Bryson and CeCe Peniston.
 2001 – The Diary of Black Men, directed by Clarence Whitmore, a play that had been touring the country since 1983
 2006 – Tyler Perry's Madea Goes to Jail played to a packed seven-date stint at the Paramount.
 2008 – Andrew Lloyd Webber's musical Cats was performed in May.

Classic movie nights

It wasn't until 1987 that the Paramount returned to its true calling as a movie house, showing Buster Keaton's The General (1926), a silent film accompanied by the Wurlitzer. In 1988, Casablanca (1942), starring Humphrey Bogart and Ingrid Bergman, launched the first movie series. The 2002 feature was Peter Sellers in Dr. Strangelove (1964).

In 2002 it showed Wizard of Oz (1939), with Judy Garland, and in 2004 the Paramount showed several classic movies: Harvey (1950), starring James Stewart, Viva Las Vegas (1964) starring Elvis Presley and Ann-Margret, The Graduate (1967) with Dustin Hoffman and Anne Bancroft, and The Bad and the Beautiful (1952) starring Kirk Douglas and Lana Turner.

The Paramount Movie Classics series continues scheduling screenings throughout the year and is enthusiastically supported by guests and staff members alike who often dress up in costume as movie characters.

Other
In order to accommodate the large number of people attending on the High Holy Days, since 2001 Oakland's Temple Sinai has held its main High Holy Day services at the Paramount, filling the entire 1,800 seats on the mezzanine of the theater, and most of the 1,200 seats in the balcony.

Notable events
The Black Filmmakers Hall of Fame was founded in 1973 in Oakland. They held elegant events that honored such screen legends as Clarence Muse, Hattie McDaniel, Billy Dee Williams, Melvin Van Peebles, and Danny Glover with the Oscar Micheaux Awards. Some of the events were hosted at Oakland's Paramount Theatre. In 2001 Harry Belafonte, Eubie Blake and Diahann Carroll was inducted in the Filmmakers Hall of Fame at the Paramount.

1995 – Poet Maya Angelou read from her work at a benefit at Paramount for the St. Paul's Episcopal School.

1999 – Actress Halle Berry was at the Paramount for the premiere of Introducing Dorothy Dandridge, an HBO docudrama.

2007 – Former Congressman Ron Dellums was sworn in on Monday, January 8, as Oakland's 48th mayor in a public ceremony at the Paramount Theatre. A crowd of 1,900 people gathered for the ceremony.

2011 – Hosting of the premiere for the 2011 film Moneyball. The cast as well as some Oakland Athletics players and executives attended the premiere.

2012 – Abel Gance's film Napoléon had four screenings from March 24 to April 1 as part of the San Francisco Silent Film Festival. Accompanied by a live orchestra, Napoléon was shown at the original 20 frames per second and ending with a 20-minute final triptych sequence. These, the first US screenings of British film historian Kevin Brownlow's 5.5-hour-long restored version, were described as requiring three intermissions, one of which was a dinner break. Score arranger Carl Davis led the 46-piece Oakland East Bay Symphony for the performances.

See also
 Alameda Theatre (Alameda, California)
 Fox Oakland Theater
 Grand Lake Theater

Footnotes

References
 Detailed History of the Paramount
 Stone, Susannah Harris. The Oakland Paramount, Lancaster-Miller Publishers (1982) –

External links

 

 Oakland East Bay Symphony
 Oakland Ballet
 Article on Paramount Theatre archives at Bancroft Library
Guide to the Paramount Theatre Records at Bancroft Library
Tours Rediscover Oakland Landmark, San Francisco Chronicle (Friday, November 20, 1998)

Dan Vint's collection of Paramount Theatre photographs

Theatres on the National Register of Historic Places in California
History of Alameda County, California
California Historical Landmarks
Cinemas and movie theaters in the San Francisco Bay Area
Concert halls in California
National Register of Historic Places in Oakland, California
Movie palaces
Theatres completed in 1931
Art Deco architecture in California
Theatres in Oakland, California
Event venues established in 1931
Theatres in the San Francisco Bay Area
Historic American Buildings Survey in California